The GE three-power boxcabs were early electro-diesel hybrid switcher locomotives. These boxcabs were termed oil battery electrics to avoid the use of the German name Diesel, unpopular after World War I.

History 

The prototype of these locomotives was New York Central 1525 delivered in February 1928. This locomotive had a center-cab design. After successful testing a series of 40 locomotives  with boxcab carbodies were built along with the line of the ALCO boxcabs by a consortium of ALCO, General Electric, Ingersoll Rand and Electric Storage Battery. ALCO built the locomotive frame, carbody and running gear, General Electric built the generator, traction motors and controls, Ingersoll Rand provided the diesel engine, and the traction batteries were made by the Electric Storage Battery Co. of Philadelphia (now Exide).  

The locomotives were mainly used in city areas for switching work, where exhaust-emissions-free operation was required at spurs entering factory halls. The main batch was ordered by New York Central Railroad to be used in the New York City area operating on the West Side Line and the High Line. Some three-power boxcabs also worked Chicago, Detroit, and Boston. One locomotive was built for Rock Island, which used it for switching the LaSalle Street Station in Chicago.

Technical Description 
The principle of operation was similar to that of modern hybrid locomotives, the diesel engine driving a main generator of 600 volts DC, which provided charging current to a bank of batteries which powered four traction motors, one per axle. In addition to being powered by the diesel engine, these locomotives were capable of operating as electric locomotives. Two of these locomotives were equipped to operate off of 3000 volt overhead lines, and 34 were capable of operating off of a 600 volt third rail. The diesel motor was used to charge the batteries, which could not be charged by third rail power. The battery consisted of 240 Exide Ironclad cells with a total capacity of 301 kWh.

See also
 ALCO boxcab, and GE boxcab, diesel-electric variants of these locomotives.

References

External links
ALCo-GE-IR Boxcabs Page
 Denver Public Library Digital Collections
 Rock Island bi-power locomotive 10,000 (1930 photo)

Diesel locomotives of the United States
Electro-diesel locomotives
General Electric locomotives
Standard gauge locomotives of the United States
Railway locomotives introduced in 1930
Scrapped locomotives